Sibylla Rubens is a German classical concert soprano.

Career 
Sibylla Rubens studied voice (concert and opera) at the Staatliche Musikhochschule in Trossingen and at the Hochschule für Musik in Frankfurt and in master classes with Edith Mathis.

She performed Fauré's Requiem with the Royal Concertgebouw Orchestra under Philippe Herreweghe. Sibylla Rubens has collaborated with Helmuth Rilling and took part in the project of Ton Koopman and the Amsterdam Baroque Orchestra & Choir to record the complete vocal works of Johann Sebastian Bach. She has also interpreted Lieder, a first recital with Irwin Gage in 1999 at the Ludwigsburg Schlossfestspiele or Hugo Wolf's Italienisches Liederbuch with Thomas Quasthoff and Justus Zeyen. At the Rheingau Musik Festival 2009 she performed the soprano part of Bach's St John Passion with the Windsbacher Knabenchor, conducted by Karl-Friedrich Beringer.

References

External links 
 Sibylla Rubens website
 Sibylla Rubens on Bach Cantatas website, 2009
 Sibylla Rubens on Naxos Cantatas website
 Entries for recordings by Sibylla Rubens on WorldCat

German sopranos
Living people
Frankfurt University of Music and Performing Arts alumni
Year of birth missing (living people)